Justin Anthony Senior (born July 8, 1994) is a Canadian-born former American football offensive tackle. He was drafted by the Seattle Seahawks in the sixth round of the 2017 NFL Draft. He played in college at Mississippi State University.

College career
He committed to Mississippi State out of high school. He started for three years at right tackle: 2014, 2015, and 2016. He was awarded the Kent Hull Trophy, which is given to the best collegiate offensive lineman in Mississippi, after the 2016 season.

Professional career

Seattle Seahawks
Senior was drafted by the Seattle Seahawks in the sixth round, 210th overall, in the 2017 NFL Draft. Senior was also drafted by the Edmonton Eskimos in the fifth round, 40th overall, in the 2017 CFL Draft. On May 12, 2017, the Seahawks signed Senior to a four-year, $2.53 million contract with a signing bonus of $136,179. On August 21, 2017, he was waived/injured by the Seahawks and placed on injured reserve. He was released with an injury settlement on December 12, 2017.

Kansas City Chiefs
On February 19, 2019, Senior was signed by the Kansas City Chiefs. On June 13, 2019, the Chiefs cut Senior.

References

External links
Mississippi State Bulldogs bio

1994 births
Living people
Sportspeople from Montreal
Black Canadian players of American football
Gridiron football people from Quebec
American football offensive tackles
Mississippi State Bulldogs football players
Seattle Seahawks players
Kansas City Chiefs players
Hargrave Military Academy alumni